The Journal of Cognition and Development is a peer-reviewed scientific journal dedicated to the study of cognitive development in humans and other animals. It was established in 2000 with Philip David Zelazo (University of Toronto) as the founding editor-in-chief. It is published five times per year by Taylor & Francis on behalf of the Cognitive Development Society, of which it is the official journal. The editor-in-chief is Susan A. Graham (University of Calgary). According to the Journal Citation Reports, the journal has a 2017 impact factor of 1.865, ranking it 43rd out of 70 journals in the category "Psychology, Developmental" and 56th out of 84 journals in the category "Psychology, Experimental".

References

External links

Publications established in 2000
Taylor & Francis academic journals
Developmental psychology journals
Experimental psychology journals
English-language journals
5 times per year journals